Vali Esmaeili (Persian: ولی اسماعیلی ; born in 1971 at Moghan, Iran), is a member of the eighth and eleventh terms of the Iran Islamic parliament. 
He is currently the head of the Social Commission of the Iranian Parliament and a member of the National Anti-Corona Headquarters in Iran.

See also 
 List of Iran's parliament representatives (11th term)
 List of Iran's parliament representatives (8th term)

References 

1971 births
Living people

21st-century Iranian politicians
Members of the 8th Islamic Consultative Assembly
Members of the 11th Islamic Consultative Assembly